The Monroe–Ruston–Bastrop Combined Statistical Area is made up of four parishes in northern Louisiana. The statistical area consists of the Monroe Metropolitan Statistical Area, the Ruston Micropolitan Statistical Area, and the Bastrop Micropolitan Statistical Area. As of the 2010 census, the CSA had a population of 251,155.

Parishes
 Lincoln Parish
 Morehouse Parish
 Ouachita Parish
 Union Parish

Communities

Places with more than 50,000 people
 Monroe (Principal city)

Places with 10,000 to 25,000 people
 Ruston (Principal city)
 Bastrop (Principal city)
 West Monroe

Places with 5,000 to 10,000 people
 Brownsville–Bawcomville
 Claiborne

Places with fewer than 5,000 people
 Bernice
 Bonita
 Collinston
 Downsville
 Farmerville
 Lillie
 Marion
 Mer Rouge
 Oak Ridge
 Richwood
 Spearsville
 Sterlington
 Swartz

Demographics
As of the census of 2000, there were 201,074 people, 75,455 households, and 53,051 families residing within the CSA. The racial makeup of the CSA was 63.74% White, 34.49% African American, 0.21% Native American, 0.53% Asian, 0.02% Pacific Islander, 0.40% from other races, and 0.61% from two or more races. Hispanic or Latino of any race were 1.21% of the population.

The median income for a household in the CSA was $28,744, and the median income for a family was $35,866. Males had a median income of $31,165 versus $20,894 for females. The per capita income for the CSA was $15,033.

See also
 Louisiana census statistical areas
 List of cities, towns, and villages in Louisiana
 List of census-designated places in Louisiana

References

Geography of Ouachita Parish, Louisiana
Geography of Morehouse Parish, Louisiana
Geography of Union Parish, Louisiana
Combined statistical areas of the United States